is a 26-episode  anime series from directors Jang Jong-Geun, Koji Itoh, and Sumio Watanabe. The series aired on TV Tokyo from October 6, 2001 to March 30, 2002.

Storyline
 Earth AD 2057
Four hundred years ago, it became certain than an asteroid would collide with Earth and the extinction of the race was at hand. Mankind spent 10 years devising a plan to survive. The Dobias went out to live in space while the Shioru forged a new world underground. Three hundred years ago, mankind returned to the surface from beyond the stars and beneath the ground.

But the surface was not what it once was, and mankind was forced to battle for supremacy with a new life form born from the ashes of destruction. Man was no longer at the top of the food chain. That spot was occupied by the Siliconians, creatures who roam the landscape searching for prey. Meanwhile, the Dobias—scientists and nobles—and the Shioru—farmers and nomads—are engaged in a cold war over the limited remaining resources, a cold war that threatens to turn hot.

Amidst this battle for survival of the fittest between creature and man are Dean Honos, Alcion Fama, Cris Vesta, Victor Deicius, and Shai Tanna. Together, they are the Geisters, the Dobias' ultimate fighting force.  They are armed powers, abilities, and weapons far beyond normal humans, and they are the last hope for mankind.

References
 DVD information at the Internet Movie Database
 Review at Anime News Network

External links 
 
 Answerman Special - The Sad Tale of Anime Crash—about the American distributor of Geisters

2001 anime television series debuts
Anime with original screenplays